Enzo Forcella (15 May 1921 – 9 February 1999) was an Italian essayist, historian and journalist.

Biography 
Born in Rome, orphan of war, Forcella graduated at the Vittorio Emanuele II National Boarding School in Rome benefiting from a free post provided for deserving students. During the World War II Forcella joined the Action Party and he started his career as a journalist in the newspaper Italia socialista. From 1950 to 1959 he was the Rome correspondent for the newspaper La Stampa, and later he collaborated with several publications, including the magazine Il Mondo and the newspapers Il Giorno and La Repubblica. Since its first experimental broadcasts until 1976, he was also a longtime collaborator of RAI, and he was director of Radio Tre between 1976 and 1985.

Also active as an essayist and an historian, in 1975 Forcella won the Bagutta Prize for his book Celebrazione di un trentennio. He also was scriptwriter of Francesco Rosi's award-winning film Hands over the City.

From 1985 to 1992, Forcella was a member of the municipal council of Rome, and between 1989 and 1992 he served as deputy mayor and councilor for transparency in the Carraro council.

References

External links 

 Profile at Giulio Einaudi Editore
 

1921 births
1999 deaths
Writers from Rome
Italian essayists
Male essayists
20th-century Italian historians
Italian male journalists
20th-century Italian writers
Rai (broadcaster) people
20th-century essayists
20th-century Italian journalists
Italian male non-fiction writers
20th-century Italian male writers